Cayo Batata is an uninhabited, grass-covered island, located at ,  east of Morro de Humacao, the closest mainland feature (which is immediately south of the mouth of Río Humacao), in Humacao, Puerto Rico.

Geography
The island is part of Río Abajo barrio of Humacao.

Gallery

References

Humacao, Puerto Rico
Cayo Santiago